Roland Martin may refer to:
 Roland Martin (fisherman), host of American fishing show on TV channel Versus
 Roland Martin (journalist) (born 1968), American author and syndicated columnist
 Roland Martin (archaeologist) (1912-1997), French archaeologist